Finesse is a jazz trio album recorded by pianist Toshiko Akiyoshi in 1978 and released on the Concord Jazz record label.

Track listing
LP side A
"Count Your Blessings (Instead of Sheep)" (Berlin) – 5:03
"American Ballad" (Akiyoshi) – 5:50
"Love Letters" (Heyman, Young) – 5:10
"Wouldn't It Be Loverly?" (Lerner, Loewe) – 5:34
LP side B
"Mr. Jelly Lord" (Morton) – 6:06
"Warning! Success May Be Hazardous to Your Health" (Akiyoshi) – 3:21
"You Go to My Head" (Coots, Gillespie) – 5:53
"Solvejg's Song" (Grieg) – 6:48

Personnel
Toshiko Akiyoshi – piano
Jake Hanna – drums
Monty Budwig – bass

References / External Links
Concord CCD 4069
[ Allmusic]

References

Toshiko Akiyoshi albums
1978 albums
Concord Records albums